Gordon Reid (29 October 1947 – 3 May 2010) was  a former Australian rules footballer who played with Geelong in the Victorian Football League (VFL).

Notes

External links 
		

1947 births
2010 deaths
Australian rules footballers from Victoria (Australia)
Geelong Football Club players